Burnsville is a community in the Canadian province of New Brunswick. It is situated in Paquetville, a parish of Gloucester County.

History

When settled in 1874, the community initially took the name of Milltown. The community's current name is derived from that of Kennedy Francis Burns, a Canadian politician and President of the Caraquet and Gulf Shore Railway, the same company that built a railroad through Burnsville.

See also
List of communities in New Brunswick
List of people from Gloucester County, New Brunswick

References

Communities in Gloucester County, New Brunswick